Potash City is a small town in Jordan near the southeastern shore of the Dead Sea.  It is located near the salt mining facilities of the Arab Potash company.

External links
 photos
 http://www.crazyguyonabike.com/doc/page/?o=3Tzut&page_id=102885&v=2t

Populated places in Jordan